The 2019–20 season is Gokulam Kerala's third season since its establishment in 2017 and their third season in the I-League. Gokulam Kerala will also be involved in the Super Cup, Durand Cup,
Sheikh Kamal Cup.

Squad information

First-team squad

other contracts

Transfers and loans

Transfers in

Transfers Out

Pre-season

Competitions

Overview

I-league

League table

Result summary

Results by round

Matches

Attendances 

|}

Durand Cup

Group stage

Semi-final

Final

Sheikh Kamal Cup

The tournament is being organised by Chittagong Abahoni, a club based in Chittagong, and the Bangladesh Football Federation. Gokulam are in group 'B' along with the Bangladesh premiere league champions Bashundhara Kings, I League champions Chennai City FC and Malaysian club Terengganu Football Club.

The tournament has started on 19 October. Only the group winners and runners up will proceed to the knockout round.

Group stage

Semi-finals

Current technical staff
As of 15 April 2018.

Statistics 
As of 02 Februaryt 2020.

Squad appearances and goals

Squad statistics

Goal Scorers

Clean sheets

Disciplinary record

See also
 2019–20 in Indian football
 2019–20 I-League

References

External links
Official website

2019–20 I-League by team
Gokulam Kerala FC seasons